18-Hydroxycorticosterone is an endogenous steroid. It is a derivative of corticosterone.

Function
18-Hydroxycorticosterone serves as an intermediate in the synthesis of aldosterone by the enzyme aldosterone synthase in the zona glomerulosa.

See also
 18-Hydroxycortisol
 Aldosterone synthase

References

Corticosteroids
Pregnanes